Frontschwein (German slang for "front pig"; see glossary of German military terms) is the thirteenth studio album by Swedish black metal band Marduk. It was released on 19 January 2015 through Century Media Records. It is the band's first album to feature drummer Fredrik Widigs.

Track listing
All music and lyrics written by Marduk.

Credits

Marduk
 Mortuus – vocals; Holy Poison Design – layout
 Morgan (Patrik Niclas Morgan Håkansson) – guitar
 Devo (Dan Evert Magnus Andersson) – bass guitar; engineering
 Fredrik Widigs – drums

Additional personnel
 Jens Rydén – photography

Charts

References

2015 albums
Marduk (band) albums
Century Media Records albums